Hay Superstar / Hye Superstar (Հայ Սուպերսթար) is the Armenian version of the British television hit show Pop Idol. It is a talent contest to find the best young singer in Armenia.

Summary

Season 1 (2006)
Auditions were held in Gyumri; Vanadzor; Stepanakert, Nagorno-Karabakh, and Yerevan. The panel of judges for the show consists of Michael Poghosyan, Egor Glumov and Naira Gurjianyan.

The first season was aired on Shant from March to late July 2006, the second season started in November 2006 to early April 2007. Season three ran exactly one year later. After a break of one year, the competition returned with a fourth season from November 2009 to March 2010.

The first ever season of Hay Superstar was won by Susanna Petrosyan. Anna Avetyan was the runner-up. Mihran Tsarukyan, who was among the final two contestants, was eliminated on suspicion of having manipulated the televote in his favour. The elimination rounds went on from March to July 2006.

Participants and dates of elimination
Susanna Petrosyan- Winner
Anna Avetyan - July 30, 2006
 Mihran Tsarukyan - July 23, 2006 /to leave voluntarily./
Lilit Hovhannisyan - July 3, 2006
Astghik Safaryan - June 26, 2006
Mariam Movsisyan - June 12, 2006
Narine Davtyan - June 5, 2006
Emilia Zaqaryan - May 29, 2006
Tatevik Hayrapetyan - May 22, 2006
Lilit Ter-Vardanyan - May 15, 2006

Elimination chart:

Season 2 (2006-2007)
The second season was broadcast starting 20 November 2006, with eliminations starting on Christmas Day of that same year. The final was on 8 April 2007. The winner was Lusine Aghabekyan, with Nare Gevorgyan runner-up and Hasmik Papyan third.

Participants and date of elimination
Lusine Aghabekyan - Winner
Nare Gevorgyan - April 8, 2007
Hasmik Papyan - March 19, 2007
Jivan Khachatryan - March 12, 2007
Heghine Shahumyan - March 5, 2007
Anna Kostanyan - February 26, 2007
Hayk Martirosyan - February 19, 2007
Suzanna Ghazaryan - February 5, 2007
Grigor Kyokchyan - January 29, 2007
Seda Hoinanyan - January 22, 2007
Liana Margaryan - January 15, 2007
Marina Kartashyan - December 25, 2006
Tigran Hovhannisyan - December 25, 2006

Themes:
December 25: Beatles Songs
January 15: Last Decade Hits
January 22: Russian Songs
January 29: Armenian Patriotism
February 5: Love Songs
February 19: 70s Hits
February 26: Armenian 80s Hits
March 5: Pop & Rock Songs
March 12: Armenian Classics
March 19: Solos & Duets
March 26: Final

Season 3 (2007-2008)
The third season of Hay Superstar was broadcast on 1 December 2007 with the finals broadcast on April 7, 2008. The winner was Lusi Harutunyan.

Participants and dates of elimination
Lusi Harutunyan - Winner
Anahit Manasyan - April 7, 2008
Sevak Xachatryan - March 25, 2008
Diana Ser-Manukyan - March 18, 2008
Hakob Chobanyan - March 11, 2008
Meri Kopushyan - February 25, 2008
Luse Saghatelyan - February 11, 2008
Ani Berberyan - February 4, 2008
Narine Dovlatyan - January 28, 2008
Diana Grigoryan - January 28, 2008
Siranush Manwelyan - January 21, 2008
Tatevik Poghosyan - January 21, 2008
Tatevik Anesyan - January 14, 2008
Viktoria Arutyunyan - January 14, 2008

Themes: 
January 14: Modern Pop Songs
January 21: Russian Songs
January 28: Armenian 70 & 80s Hits
February 4: N/A
February 11: N/A
February 25: Duets with Armenian Stars
March 11: National Songs of Ashughs
March 18: N/A
March 25: N/A
April 7: Final

Elimination chart:

Season 4 (2009-2010)
After broadcasts were suspended for a full year, Hay Superstar returned for a fourth season by the late 2000s. The first broadcast was on 9 November 2009 and elimination rounds started on 14 December 2009. The season ended in March 2010.

List of participants eliminated with dates of elimination
Raffi Ohanyan -  Winner
Raysa Avanesyan - 14 March 2010
Suren Arustamyan  - 1 March 2010
Gor Harutunyan - 22 February 2010
Iveta Mukuchyan - 15 February 2010
Hayk Petrosyan - 8 February 2010
Mariam Avetisyan - 1 February 2010
Pareli Amirxanyan - 25 January 2010
Eva Khazaryan - 18 January 2010
Yulya Zakarian - 28 December 2009
Anna Dovlatian - 21 December 2009
Meline Apoyan - 21 December 2009
Senik Barseghyan - 14 December 2009
Syuzanna Melqonyan - 14 December 2009

Themes: 
December 14: N/A
December 21: 80 & 90s Hits
December 28: Elvis Presley and The Beatles songs
January 18: Pop rock
January 25: Patriotic songs
February 1: N/A
February 8: Armenian rock and pop-rock
February 15: Love Day
February 22: Armenian Variety Art & Folk Songs

Elimination chart

 After it was announced that Meline Apoyan and Suren Arustamyan were voted out, Anna quit the show by her own decision. So, Suren returned to the show according to the decision of 2 members of the jury Naira Gyurjinyan and Egor Glumov and the producer Andre Simonyan.
 After the announcement that Mariam Avetisyan was voted out, Pareli quit the show due to personal problems in Iran.  Mariam returned to the show by decision of the producers' staff.

Season 5 (2011)
After broadcasts were suspended for a full year, Hay Superstar returned for a fifth season in October 2011. Audition rounds started being broadcast on 16 October 2011.

The live shows will be broadcast are on Sundays at 20:10 and there are three weekly diary shows on Tuesdays, Thursdays and Saturdays at 16:45.

The jury for season 5 are singer-songwriters André and Leila Saribekyan, presenter Avet Barsekhyan and actor, writer, director producer Garik Baboyan.

Elimination chart

References in Popular Media
Moe Szyslak of The Simpsons referenced Hay Superstar as "Armenian Idol" and mentioned Egor Glumov in episode 23 of season 21, titled "Judge Me Tender", which aired on May 23, 2010.

See also
X-Factor (Armenia)

References

 
Idols (franchise)
Armenian reality television series
Television series by Fremantle (company)
Armenian music television series
Non-British television series based on British television series
2006 Armenian television series debuts
2000s Armenian television series
2011 Armenian television series endings
2010s Armenian television series
Shant TV original programming